Helcogramma hudsoni, known commonly as the Hudson's triplefin, is a species of triplefin blenny in the genus Helcogramma. It was described by David Starr Jordan and Alvin Seale in 1906, the specific name honouring the illustrator of their monograph on Samoan fishes, R.L. Hudson. This species is found in the western Pacific Ocean where it has been recorded from  the Izu Islands, Ryukyu Islands, Savo Island, New Caledonia, Vanuatu, Fiji, and Samoa.

References

Hudson's triplefin
Fish described in 1906
Taxa named by David Starr Jordan